The Let's Talk About Love World Tour is the eighth concert tour by Canadian recording artist Celine Dion. Visiting North America, Asia and Europe; the trek supported Dion's fifth English and fifteenth studio album Let's Talk About Love (1997). and her eleventh French and sixteenth studio album, S'il suffisait d'aimer (1998). The tour marks Dion's last worldwide tour until her Taking Chances World Tour in 2008–2009. Initially planned for 1998, the success of the tour continued into 1999. In 1998, the tour earned nearly $30 million from its concerts in North America alone. In Japan, tickets were immediately sold out on the first day of public sale. It was also nominated for "Major Tour of the Year" and "Most Creative Stage Production" at the Pollstar Industry Awards. Overall, the tour grossed about $91.2 million from 69 reported shows.

Background
During a press conference following her win at the 25th Annual American Music Awards, Dion stated she would like to start touring during the summer of 1998. Following the award show appearance, the singer performed at the Crown Showroom in Melbourne and the Blaisdell Arena in Honolulu with a set list similar to that in the Falling Into You Tour, but also including "The Reason" and "My Heart Will Go On". The tour was officially announced in February 1998. Originally called Celine Dion: On Tour 1998, the tour was set to begin August in Boston, this would mark the third time Dion has begun a tour in the city. She says it is the closest U.S. city to Montreal and considers it a "lucky charm".

The tour was sponsored by Procter & Gamble (Canada), Avon (Europe) and Ericsson (United States). The telecommunications company initiated an aggressive campaign with Dion. Commercials were shown throughout the US and Canada showing concertgoers using their cell phones as lighters during Dion's performance. Those who purchased an Ericsson phone were given a special behind-the-scenes tour video entitled "Celine Dion: In Her Own Words". The tour was met early with controversy as the singer's performance at Madison Square Garden was subject to a ticket scam. During the trek, Dion opened the Broward County Civic Arena. The concert was attended by nearly 20,000 spectators and was sold out with 2 two hours.
Dion further remarked the setlist of the tour will contain songs from her current album, her hits and a few French selections. She continued:"I'm going to definitely sing the new songs and a few French ones and definitely people's favorite. I can't do them all, unfortunately, because I have to do a two-hour show. It would take a long time to sing all my songs. I hope we have chosen the right ones for people to hear".

During the course of the tour, Dion released a French-language album entitled, S'il suffisait d'aimer and a Christmas album called, These Are Special Times. In November 1998, Dion had her first CBS special promoting the album. It featured Rosie O'Donnell performing "Do You Hear What I Hear?" with Dion. The show received two Emmy Award nominations. The singer ended the year with performing at the Billboard Music Award, Top of the Pops and an appearance on Touched by an Angel.

As the tour continued into 1999, Dion performed in Hong Kong, Japan and an additional outing for North America. During this time, Dion's husband René Angélil was diagnosed with skin cancer. This forced the singer to postpone the remaining dates in the U.S. and the entire European leg. Dion resumed the tour in mid-June and thanked fans for their support during the rough period. After her tour of Europe, Dion's team announced the singer would give a special New Year's Eve concert in Montreal. Dubbed "The Millennium Concert" the show featured a new setlist and special appearances by prominent Canadian singers. At the same time, David Foster began negotiations to have Dion, Barbra Streisand, Whitney Houston and Andrea Bocelli to conduct a mini-tour titled "Three Divas and a Tenor". The tour never came to fruition.

In October, Dion opened the new Pepsi Center in Denver, replacing the McNichols Sports Arena. Dion dedicated the concert to the victims and survivors of the Columbine High School massacre. All proceeds from the show were donated to Colorado Organization of Victim Assistance. The singer was joined onstage by the Colorado Children's Chorale to perform "Let's Talk About Love" and  "Friend of Mine Columbine"— a memorial song written by Stephen and Jonathan Cohen. The singer stated it would be her last tour as she wanted to focus on becoming a mother. Later, Dion released her first English greatest hits album, All the Way... A Decade of Song.  The album was promoted by Dion's second CBS special, taking place at Radio City Music Hall. The special featured Dion performing her classics along with new songs on the album. The show featured duets with 'N Sync and Gloria Estefan. After her break, Dion began her first residency show at The Colosseum at Caesars Palace from 2003 to 2007. The tour serves as Dion's final concert tour until 2008 for the Taking Chances World Tour.

About the stage
The tour brought a new aspect to performing for Dion. The show was presented in the round. The stage designer Yves Aucoin states he wanted the show to be a big production while having an intimate feel. The stage itself was shaped like a heart with five circular platforms that raised and lowered the members of the stage. The constructor is Scène Éthique. Above, four large video screens formed a circular pattern. The floor of the stage was made of large video screens utilizing the JumboTron technology. Dion initially was nervous performing in the way, as the performer had very little time to relax while on stage. She continues to say she got the idea from attending a Stevie Wonder concert during her childhood. The entire production cost more than $10 million.

Opening acts

André-Philippe Gagnon (North America—Leg 1, England)
Human Nature (Asia)
Dakota Moon (North America—Leg 2, select dates)

Dany Brillant (Belgium, France)
Xavier Naidoo (Germany)
The Corrs (Scotland)

Mike + The Mechanics (England)
Corey Hart (North America—Leg 3, select dates)
Flip Schultz (Sunrise—November 1999)

Setlist

"Let's Talk About Love"
"Declaration of Love"
"Because You Loved Me"
"The Reason"
"It's All Coming Back to Me Now"
"To Love You More"
"Treat Her Like a Lady"
"Tell Him"
"S'il suffisait d'aimer"
"Love Is On the Way"
"All By Myself"
Medley:
"The First Time Ever I Saw Your Face"
"Because"
"Tears in Heaven"
"All the Way"
"Love Can Move Mountains"
"Stayin' Alive"
"You Should Be Dancing" (Dance Interlude)
"Immortality"
Encore
 "My Heart Will Go On"

"Let's Talk About Love"
"Dans un autre monde"
"Je sais pas"
"The Reason"
"Je crois toi"
"To Love You More"
"Treat Her Like a Lady"
"Terre"
"Tell Him"
"J'irai où tu iras"
"S'il suffisait d'aimer"
"On ne change pas"
"I'm Your Angel" (with background vocalist Barnev Valsaint)
"The Power of Love"
 Medley:
"Ce n'était qu'un rêve"
"D'amour ou d'amitié"
"Mon ami m'a quittée"
"L'amour existe encore"
"Un garçon pas comme les autres (Ziggy)"
"Love Can Move Mountains"
"Stayin' Alive"
"You Should Be Dancing" (Dance Interlude)
"Pour que tu m'aimes encore"
Encore
 "My Heart Will Go On"

"My Heart Will Go On"
"Destin"
"All the Way"
"The First Time Ever I Saw Your Face"
 Medley:
"Ce n'était qu'un rêve"
"D'amour ou d'amitié"
"Mon ami m'a quittée"
"Une colombe"
"Un garçon pas comme les autres (Ziggy)"
"That's the Way It Is"
"I'm Your Angel" (duet with Garou)
"When I Fall in Love" (duet with Daniel Lavoie)
"J'irai où tu iras" (duet with Luck Mervil)
"Le blues du businessman" (duet with Bruno Pelletier)
"Regarde-moi"
"L'amour existe encore"
"Summer of '69" (Bryan Adams solo)
"It's Only Love" (duet with Bryan Adams)
"When You're Gone" (duet with Bryan Adams)
"(Everything I Do) I Do It for You" (duet with Bryan Adams)
"Live (for the One I Love)"
"Des mots qui sonnent"
"Unison" (featuring Stéphane Rousseau)
"Incognito"
"Love Can Move Mountains"
"Pour que tu m'aimes encore"
"S’il suffisait d’aimer"
"All by Myself"
"Ce n'était qu'un rêve"

Additional notes
For the performance of "Let's Talk About Love", Dion was joined each night onstage by a local children's choir except from London where she was joined with a group of children from a charity to raise awareness.*
During the first leg in North America, "Zora sourit" often replaced "S'il suffisait d'aimer". 
"Zora Sourit", "Immortality" and the "English acoustic medley" were performed at select concerts in Montreal.
 The performance of "Treat Her Like a Lady" of 18 December in Montreal was used as a videoclip and audio release for the single of "Treat Her Like a Lady".
During the concert at the Orlando Arena, Dion performed "Fly". During the same concert, Dion was joined onstage by Diana King to perform "Treat Her Like a Lady".
During the New York City concert on 3 September 1998, Diana King also joined Dion for "Treat Her Like a Lady", and comedian Ana Gasteyer made a surprise appearance reprising her famous spoof of Dion from Saturday Night Live on stage in a funny onstage sketch.  
During the concert at the Broward County Civic Arena, Dion was joined onstage by the Bee Gees to perform "Immortality".
During concerts in 1999, "I'm Your Angel" was performed in lieu of "Love Is On the Way". Additionally, "The Power of Love" was performed in lieu of "All By Myself".
During concerts in Paris, Dion performed "To Love You More" in lieu of "It's All Coming Back to Me Now".
During concerts in Japan, Dion performed "Watashi Wa Totemo Shiawase Ne" in lieu of "S'il suffisait d'aimer". She also performed "Pour que tu m'aimes encore" in lieu of "I'm Your Angel".
"Think Twice" was performed at Hong Kong.
During the European leg of the tour, Dion performed "Think Twice" and "Pour que tu m'aimes encore".
During the concert in Paris, Dion was joined onstage by Jean-Jacques Goldman to perform "J'irai où tu iras".

Shows

Cancellations and rescheduled shows

Broadcasts and recordings

The first glimpse of the tour came via Dion's music video to "S'il suffisait d'aimer", which was recorded during her concert in Chicago.  Footage of that show, along with footage of one of the December 1998 Montreal concerts was also shown on the TV special "Un An Avec Céline" hosted by Julie Snyder.  The final show at the National Car Rental Center was filmed and showed on The Oprah Winfrey Show. The special also includes a behind the scenes feature. The singer also performed "To Love You More" live in Tokyo for the United Negro College Fund's "An Evening of Stars". The millennium concert was aired on TVA (Canada).

The concerts at the Stade de France in Saint-Denis were recorded for a CD/DVD package. The performances were released under the title Au cœur du stade (meaning At the Heart of the Stadium). The package were released separately with DVD following the CD release. The DVD includes exclusive footage from the making of S'il suffisait d'aimer and Let's Talk About Love. It features an appearance by guest star Sir George Martin, and rare footage of Céline Dion, Barbra Streisand, David Foster, and the "Tell Him" lyricists chatting around the piano.

For the show, Jean-Jacques Goldman joined Celine Dion on "J'irai où tu iras", "To Love You More" features Taro Hakase on violin, and Diana King can be seen on a screen during "Treat Her Like a Lady". The CD contains an abbreviated version of the concert, primarily showcasing her French-language songs. A live video of "Dans Un Autre Monde" was used to promote both the CD and DVD packages.  The anglophone version of the tour has not been released to the public.

Critical reception
For the tour, Dion received mainly positive reviews from music critics. Many of the writers commended the singer's intimate connection with the audience, despite the massive size of the stadiums and arenas. For the inaugural concert in Boston, Steve Morse (The Boston Globe) writes "Despite Dion's nerves, she was able to pull off a successful concert". He continues, "For pure entertainment, however, this was a volcanic triumph". Dion thanked Boston fans for being "lucky charm people"; this was the third time she opened a world tour here.
 
At The Arena in Oakland, James Sullivan (San Francisco Chronicle) felt the night showed off Dion's prowess as a performer. He elaborated, "Easily the best part of the 80-minute set came when Dion summoned her band to center stage, where they sat on the lip of the riser as she essayed a medley of some favorite songs. Roberta Flack's 'The First Time Ever I Saw Your Face', the Beatles' 'Pet Sounds'-inspired 'Because' and Eric Clapton's 'Tears in Heaven' were all delivered with tender care—no small feat in a basketball gym. Even Sinatra's 'All the Way' steered clear of swagger, and the accordion gave all four songs a touch of Dion's romantic French-language roots".

Adam Sandler (Variety) provided a positive review of Dion's concert at the Great Western Forum. He states, "To her credit, Celine Dion kept the vocal histrionics and hyper stage movements she has become known for to a minimum during her sold-out show Wednesday at the Forum, preferring instead to illustrate her evolution as an artist through singing prowess and a relaxed stage manner". Jane Stevenson (Jam! Music) gave the singer's show at the new Air Canada Centre four out of five stars. She says, "But as the first song of the night, 'Let's Talk About Love', progressed, her nine-person band eventually rose up alongside her, while a children's choir later took the stage for the song's big ending".

Personnel
Production
Tour director: Suzanne Gingue
Production director: Ian Donald
Assistant to the tour director: Michel Dion
Front of house sound engineer: Danis Savage
Security (1999): Darrell Featherstone
Stage sound engineer: Daniel Baron
Sound system technicians: François Desjardins, Marc Beauchamp, Marc Thériault
Lighting director: Yves Aucoin
Assistant lighting director: Normand Chassé
Lighting technicians: Jean-François Canuel, Antoine Malette, Michel Pommerleau
Band gear technicians: Jean-François Dubois, Guy Vignola, Stéphane Hamel
Head Carpenter: Donald Chouinard 
Set: Tonje Wold
Head rigger: Frédéric Morosovsky
Production assistant: Patrick Angélil
DVD Director: Gerard Pullicino
DVD Producer: Vito Luprano

Band
Keyboards: Claude "Mego" Lemay
Drums: Dominique Messier
Bass: Marc Langis
Keyboards: Yves Frulla
Guitars: André Coutu
Percussion: Paul Picard
Violin on "To Love You More": Taro Hakase
Backing vocals, cello and tin whistle: Elise Duguay
Backing vocals: Julie LeBlanc, Terry Bradford (1998), Gregory Charles (Montreal 1998), Barnev Valsaint (1999)

External links
Dion's Official Website

References

Celine Dion concert tours
1998 concert tours
1999 concert tours